Cornsweet is a surname. Notable people with the surname include:

 Al Cornsweet (1906–1991), American football player and coach
 Tom Cornsweet (1929–2017), American experimental psychologist
 Cornsweet illusion